The Poway Group is a geologic group in San Diego County, Southern California. It preserves fossils dating back to the Paleogene period.

Poway clasts
Volcanic clastic rock cobbles of rhyolite, in a sandstone matrix in this area are named Poway clasts.

The ancient Ballena River brought rhyolite-gravel, or “Poway" clasts, from a region in present-day Sonora, Mexico to the Pacific Ocean. Its sediments deposited into alluvial fan-submarine canyon-submarine fan complex extending for miles offshore. Remnants of submarine fan facies outcrops are found as far west as the northern Channel Islands.

Stratigraphy
Kennedy and Moore (1971) describe a stratigraphy of up to three geologic formations, Stadium Conglomerate, Mission Valley Formation, and the later named Pomerado Conglomerate. The basal unit is the Stadium Conglomerate. The Stadium Conglomerate is overlain by the Mission Valley Formation.  The Mission Valley Formation is overlain by the Pomerado Conglomerate.

See also

 List of fossiliferous stratigraphic units in California
 
 Paleontology in California

References

Paleogene California
Geology of San Diego County, California
Poway, California
Geologic formations of California